Madhu Shalini  is an Indian actress and model who predominantly works in Telugu films, in addition to Hindi and Tamil language films.  She won the title of Miss Andhra Pradesh in 2005. She hosted a television show Premakathalu after winning Dream Girl contest.

Early life
Madhu Shalini was born in Hyderabad, India. Her father Hameed is a businessman and mother Polapragada Raj Kumari is an advocate and a classical dancer. Like her mother, she also learned Kuchipudi, before taking part in a beauty contest, which she won and which paved her way for a modelling career.

Career

After working as a television anchor for a short while, she soon ventured into film business, turning an actress.

She made her feature film debut with the film, E. V. V. Satyanarayana's Kithakithalu, opposite Allari Naresh, released in 2006, which went on to become a very successful venture. The same year, she had appeared in two more Telugu films, namely Teja's Oka V Chitram as part of an ensemble cast, and Aganthakudu. In 2007, she starred in the Telugu action comedy State Rowdy, a remake of the successful Tamil K. S. Ravikumar-directorial Aethiree, with Madhu Shalini playing a Brahmin girl character, played by Kanika in the original. She made her Tamil film debut later that year with the low-budget feature Pazhaniappa Kalloori.

She later signed to play the lead female in D. Sabhapathy's Telugu project Happy Journey, while she also agreed to appear in the director's next Tamil venture, Pathinaaru, which, despite being heavily delayed, became her next release. Though the film received mixed reviews and fared averagely at the box office, Madhu Shalini's performance as Indhu received positive reviews, with critics citing that she performed her role "with consummate ease", was "adequate in her role", and acted "like a pro". Her subsequent release, Karalu Miriyalu, likewise, released to negative reviews, while her performance, however, met with favorable remarks from critics, with one reviewer claiming that she "looks pretty and dishes out a pleasing work", further noting that it was a pity that she does not get to work in any "big projects". She eventually got her big break as she was cast by noted National Film Award-winning filmmaker Bala for his comedy flick Avan Ivan. She disclosed that Bala selected her without even auditioning her, after numerous girls were auditioned for the role, with none of them measuring up to Bala's expectations. Madhu Shalini would play a college student in the film, for which she did not apply any makeup, while also dubbing for herself for the first time.

She made her Bollywood debut in Ram Gopal Varma's Department, that featured her as a gangster alongside Amitabh Bachchan, Sanjay Dutt and Rana Daggubati. She collaborated with Ram Gopal Varma again later that year on the horror flick Bhoot Returns and two years later on the psychological thriller Anukshanam. Madhu Shalini will be seen as a reporter in Gopala Gopala. Lastly, she was seen in the Tamil movie Thoongavanam as Esther, a nurse and as Seetha in Seethavalokanam.

Filmography

Films

Television

References

External links 

 
 
 

1989 births
Living people
Actresses from Hyderabad, India
Indian film actresses
Actresses in Tamil cinema
Indian television actresses
21st-century Indian actresses
Telugu actresses
Actresses in Telugu cinema
Actresses in Kannada cinema
Actresses in Hindi cinema
Female models from Hyderabad, India